True Blue is a crime novel written by David Baldacci. The book was initially published on October 27, 2009, by Grand Central Publishing. The novel focuses on Mason "Mace" Perry who once was a cop with the D.C. police, but was kidnapped and framed for a crime she did not commit. Now she is released from prison and tries to be a cop once again.

References

External links

2009 American novels
Novels by David Baldacci